Niní Gordini Cervi (1907–1988) was an Italian actress. She was married to the actor Gino Cervi. She worked in films, radio and on the stage.

Selected filmography
 Five to Nil (1932)
 The Two Misanthropists (1937)
 We Were Seven Sisters (1939)
 A Thousand Lire a Month (1939)
 The First Woman Who Passes (1940)
 The White Angel (1943)

References

Bibliography
 Goble, Alan. The Complete Index to Literary Sources in Film. Walter de Gruyter, 1999.

External links

1907 births
1988 deaths
People from Lugo, Emilia-Romagna
Italian film actresses
Burials at the Cimitero Flaminio